Draper Correctional Facility was an Alabama Department of Corrections state prison for men located in Elmore, Elmore County, Alabama. The prison first opened in 1939 with a capacity of 600 beds, replacing the former Speigner Reformatory.  Speigner had been founded circa 1900 and employed inmates on a farm and cotton mill on site.  It was destroyed by fire in November 1932

Draper retains a farming operation and a furniture plant, as well as vocational training and employing inmates on facility maintenance. Each prisoner has an assigned job.  It was named for Hamp Draper, the then-director of the state corrections department.

Elmore is the site of three Alabama state prisons:  Draper, Staton Correctional Facility which is immediately adjacent, and the Elmore Correctional Facility about a mile to the east.

References

External links 
interior view of Draper in 1975, during a period of overcrowded conditions

Prisons in Alabama
Buildings and structures in Elmore County, Alabama
State government buildings in Alabama
1939 establishments in Alabama
2018 disestablishments in Alabama